The olive-backed forest robin (Stiphrornis erythrothorax pyrrholaemus) is a subspecies of the forest robin found in the Gamba Complex in southwest Gabon. It was described in 2008. The olive-backed forest robin can be separated from other subspecies of the forest robin by the combination of its olive upperparts, bright orange throat and chest, and cream-yellow belly. Its song is also distinct from other subspecies of the forest robin. Females are generally duller than males. It has not been evaluated by IUCN, but has been described as locally common.

Though this subspecies was described recently, a juvenile appears to have been collected on 11 November 1953 in Tchibanga, Gabon. The specimen is deposited in the Muséum national d'Histoire naturelle in Paris. Its identity was confirmed by comparison of the DNA sequences.

Taxonomy

All taxa within the genus Stiphrornis were considered part of a single species, S. erythrothorax, until 1999, when it was argued, based on the phylogenetic species concept, that all then-recognized taxa should be considered monotypic species. The split was not followed in Handbook of the Birds of the World, where it was described as "perhaps premature". Comparably, the BirdLife Taxonomic Working Group (and consequently IUCN) recommended not following the split, as differences in plumages are relatively small, genetic sampling was considered incomplete, and evidence for intergradation or parapatry is lacking. Based on mtDNA, S. pyrrholaemus is placed within S. erythrothorax sensu lato, and consequently is considered a species (rather than a subspecies of S. erythrothorax) only if at least some of the taxonomy recommended in 1999 is followed. The genetic divergence between S. pyrrholaemus and other members of the genus is comparable to that between some other closely related species. Clements also split the species.

References

Endemic fauna of Gabon
Stiphrornis
Birds described in 2008
Taxa named by Brian K. Schmidt